Bryotropha dryadella is a moth of the family Gelechiidae. It is found in Great Britain, France, Portugal, Spain, Corsica, Sardinia, Sicily, Italy, Albania, North Macedonia, Bulgaria, Greece, Crete and Algeria.

The wingspan is 10–12 mm. The forewings are dark grey-brown. The hindwings are pale fuscous, but darker towards the apex. Adults have been recorded on wing from May to September, in southern Europe probably in two generations per year.

Larvae live in densely spun silken tubes amongst Ctenidium molluscum, Barbula unguiculata, Homalothecium lutescens and Bryum species, often in association with grasses which occasionally showed signs of feeding, probably by the dryadella-larvae. The larvae have a purplish brown body with a pale brown head.

References

Moths described in 1850
dryadella
Moths of Europe
Moths of Africa